Accra Shepp (born 1962) is an American photographer.

Early life and education
Shepp's father is the saxophonist Archie Shepp.

Shepp received BFA and MFA degrees from the School of Visual Arts, New York.

Art career
His work is included in the collections of the Museum of Fine Arts, Houston, the Art Institute of Chicago and the Museum of Modern Art, New York.

References

Living people
1962 births
20th-century American artists
21st-century American artists